A mountain resort is a place to holiday or vacation located in an elevated and typically at least relatively isolated area.  The term resort implies integral hotel or inn accommodations, restaurants, and either or both sports facilities or scenic attractions.  These can either be part of a "destination resort" that provides both accommodations and activities, or in a "resort town" that offers amenities near outdoor areas. 

Winter sports include skiing, snowboarding, and ice skating, and summer activities such as hiking, golf, and tennis. Sightseeing and related activities such as leaf peeping to appreciate Fall colors are also common where foliage turns.

In hot climates hill and mountain resorts are visited for the cooler temperatures at higher elevations.

North America

In the United States and Canada the term "mountain resort" usually denotes a resort visited all year, both for winter sports and summer activities, such as hiking, golf, tennis, and mountain biking.

Some North American mountain resorts - both resort towns and individual venues - include:
 Aspen, Colorado
 Attitash, New Hampshire
 Big Bear Lake, California
 Big Sky, Montana
 Cranmore, New Hampshire
 Flagstaff, Arizona
 Killington, Vermont
 Loghill Village, Colorado
 Mountain Village, Colorado
 Ouray, Colorado
 Teton Village, Wyoming
 Whistler, British Columbia
 Whitefish, Montana

India

In British India the colonial rulers developed resorts in the Himalayas and in mountainous areas of South India known as "hill stations", where they could escape the summer heat of the plains.

Other countries

In China the emperors of the Qing Dynasty built the Chengde Mountain Resort in the 18th century, as a retreat from the summer heat of Beijing.

In Pakistan, the Galyat areas are a popular summer destination. They are also favorite for a cold snowy experience in the winter. Murree, Ayubia, Nathiagali, Kalabagh are some of the popular places. Other places like the Northern Areas which include Gilgit Baltistan and Kashmir are also a choice.

In the Philippines, the American colonial government built its first summer capital in Baguio to escape Manila's heat.

In Turkey, city dwellers traditionally spent summer vacations at mountain resorts known as yaylas, to escape the summer heat.

In Cyprus the most popular mountain resort is Platres

In Thailand the third highest mountain is a popular resort at Doi Ang Kang in Chiangmai province Fang District.

See also
Ski resort

References

 Dorward, Sherry (1990) Design for Mountain Communities: A Landscape and Architectural Guide Van Nostrand Reinhold